In Ohio, State Route 24 may refer to:
U.S. Route 24 in Ohio, the only Ohio highway numbered 24 since 1927
Ohio State Route 24 (1923-1927), now SR 124

24